Ducker & Son was a traditional shoe makers in Turl Street in Oxford. The business was founded by Edward Ducker in 1898.  A limited company was formed following the deaths of Ducker and his wife in 1947.

The shop was featured in the 2007 film Atonement.

Ducker & Son closed at the end of November 2016.  Its archives are now held in the Bodleian Library.

Customers
Customers included:

 H. H. Asquith - Prime Minister 
 Rowan Atkinson - English actor and comedian known for Mr. Bean and Blackadder.
 Jeremy Clarkson - English broadcaster and writer known for BBC TV show Top Gear. 
 David Cornwell - Irish/British author who wrote under the pen name John le Carré.
 Matt Flynn - English writer.
 Eddie Jordan -  Irish businessman and former Formula One team boss.
 Lady Ottoline Morrell - Literary salonist
 Matthew Pinsent - English Olympic rower and broadcaster.
 J.R.R. Tolkien - English writer and Oxford don known for The Hobbit and The Lord of the Rings.
 Evelyn Waugh - English writer known for Brideshead Revisited.

Local legend
A local legend, mentioned by Jan Morris in Oxford (1965), tells of an old basketwork armchair reported to materialise in a room above the shop for a few seconds and then gradually fade away. Yurdan, however, states that it has been a long time since reports of any sightings have been made.

References

1898 establishments in England
1898 establishments in the United Kingdom
2016 disestablishments in England
British companies disestablished in 2016
British companies established in 1898
Clothing companies established in 1898
Defunct retail companies of the United Kingdom
History of Oxford
Independent stores
Reportedly haunted locations in South East England
Shops in Oxford
Shoe companies of the United Kingdom